Bryan is an unincorporated community in Scott County, in the U.S. state of Arkansas.

History
Bryan, also called "Bryan's Spur", developed along the Arkansas Western Railroad which was built through the area in the early 1900s. A post office called "Bryan Spur" was established in 1915, but closed within that same year.

References

Unincorporated communities in Arkansas
Unincorporated communities in Scott County, Arkansas